Flight Plan: A Review Of Civil Aviation In Australia Today is a 1950 Australian documentary directed by Lee Robinson and Stanley Hawes for the Australian National Film Board.

References

External links

Complete film at YouTube
Page on film at Airway Museum

Australian documentary films